Hasan Sönmez (born September 27, 1976 in İznik, Bursa, Turkey) is a retired Turkish footballer. He played for seven different clubs throughout his career, including Gençlerbirliği, Trabzonspor  and Kayserispor. He finished his career with Iznikspor in 2011–12, the same team he started his career with in 1994.

Career
Hasan Sönmez spent his youth career with Iznikspor, he made his career debut on 17 September 1994 in a 2–1 away defeat against Beylerbeyi. He made 23 appearances in the 1994–95 TFF Third League season for Iznikspor before departing in 1995 to sign his first professional contract with Gençlerbirliği. He made his Gençlerbirliği debut in a 5–2 away defeat to Nazilli Belediyespor in the Turkish Cup. He remained with the club until 2003 when he left to join Trabzonspor, with whom he appeared in 18 league matches. During his time with Trabzonspor, he was a part of the club's 2003–04 Turkish Cup winning side.

His spell with Trabzonspor included two loan spells, the first to Akçaabat Sebatspor (13 apps in all competitions) and the second to Kayserispor (3 apps in all competitions). The latter became Sönmez's fourth permanent career club as he joined Kayserispor permanently ahead of the 2007–08 season. He made 10 appearances over two competitions for the team before leaving at the end of the season to sign for Samsunspor, his parting gift from Kayserispor was the 2007–08 Turkish Cup which him and the club won in a final against Sönmez's old club, Gençlerbirliği.

His move to Samsunspor saw the return of regular first-team football as he played 31 times overall for Samsunspor during 2008–09, despite this Sönmez was on the move again in September 2009 when he agreed to join Antalyaspor. After not making a single appearance for the club in any competition, he left Antalyaspor a year later. After being a free agent between July 2010 and February 2011, Sönmez got back into football and returned to his first club Iznikspor. He participated in 22 Turkish Regional Amateur League matches for the team before retiring in 2012.

Career statistics
.

Honours
Gençlerbirliği
Turkish Cup (1): 2001

Trabzonspor
Turkish Cup (1): 2003–04

Kayserispor
Turkish Cup (1): 2007–08

External links
 Profile at TFF.org

1976 births
Living people
Samsunspor footballers
Kayserispor footballers
Gençlerbirliği S.K. footballers
Trabzonspor footballers
Akçaabat Sebatspor footballers
Turkish footballers
Turkey youth international footballers
Association football goalkeepers
Süper Lig players